Juan Carlos Mesías (6 July 1933 – 21 April 2002) was a Uruguayan footballer. He played in 15 matches for the Uruguay national football team from 1959 to 1960. He was also part of Uruguay's squad for the 1959 South American Championship that took place in Argentina.

References

External links
 

1933 births
2002 deaths
Uruguayan footballers
Uruguay international footballers
Place of birth missing
Association football defenders
Club Nacional de Football players
Racing Club de Avellaneda footballers
Newell's Old Boys footballers
Argentino de Quilmes players